Patricia Rose is a retired United States Air Force major general.

On April 21, 2013, USAF Major General Patricia A. "Trish" Rose became the first openly LGBT officer to be promoted to the rank of major general. She was nominated to the rank on December 7, 2012, and pinned on May 31, 2013, in a ceremony led by her direct supervisor, General Janet C. Wolfenbarger, the first female four-star general in the United States Air Force.  At the time, Maj Gen Rose was assigned as mobilization assistant to the commander, Air Force Materiel Command, Wright-Patterson Air Force Base.  Her last active duty assignment was as mobilization assistant to the deputy chief of staff for logistics, engineering and force protection, Headquarters U.S. Air Force, Washington, D.C.  In that capacity, she supported the deputy chief of staff in leadership, management and integration of Air Force logistics readiness, aircraft and missile maintenance, civil engineering and security forces, as well as setting policy and preparing budget estimates that reflected enhancements to productivity, combat readiness and quality of life for Air Force members.

Major General Rose retired on 16 June 2017.  She is married to retired Navy LT Julie Roth.

General Rose entered the Air Force through Officer Training School in 1984. Her more notable assignments include mobilization assistant to the director for logistics, engineering, and security assistance, U.S. Pacific Command, and mission director for the U.S. Central Command Deployment and Distribution Operations Center in Southwest Asia, where she directed joint logistics for operations Iraqi Freedom and Enduring Freedom.

Education
 1983 Bachelor of Arts degree in humanities, Providence College, Rhode Island
 1988 Squadron Officer School, Maxwell AFB, Alabama
 1989 Master of Science degree in education, Eastern Illinois University, Charleston, Illinois
 2000 NATO Reserve Officer's Course, NATO Defense College, Rome, Italy
 2001 Air Command and Staff College, by correspondence
 2002 Air War College, by correspondence
 2003 Reserve Component National Security Course, National Defense University, Fort Lesley J. McNair, Washington, D.C.
 2007 Strategy and Operations Course, Naval War College, Newport, Rhode Island
 2009 Advanced Joint Professional Military Education, Joint Forces Staff College, Norfolk, Virginia
 2011 System Acquisition Management Course, Defense Acquisition University, Fort Belvoir, Virginia
 2011 Senior Executives in National and International Security, Harvard Kennedy School of Government, Cambridge, Massachusetts
 2012 Nuclear 400, Air Force Nuclear Weapons Center, Kirkand AFB, New Mexico
 2012 Air Force Smart Operations (AFSO21), University of Tennessee, Knoxville, Tennessee
 2012 Pentagon Media Training, Washington, D.C.

Assignments
 April 1984 – September 1984, student, Aircraft Maintenance Officer Course, Chanute Technical Training Center, Rantoul, Illinois
 September 1984 – December 1986, aircraft maintenance officer, Plattsburgh AFB, New York
 January 1987 – January 1991, instructor, Aircraft Maintenance Officer Course, Chanute Technical Training Center, Rantoul, Illinois
 January 1991 – June 1992, air terminal operations center duty officer, Norton AFB, California
 June 1992 – December 1993, quality/transportation officer, Norton and March AFBs, California
 January 1994 – November 1995, air transportation officer, 86th Aerial Port Squadron, McChord AFB, Washington
 December 1995 – June 1996, executive officer, 86th Aerial Port Squadron, McChord AFB, Washington
 June 1996 – July 1998, operations officer, 36th Aerial Port Squadron, McChord AFB, Washington
 July 1998 – February 2003, commander, 36th Aerial Port Squadron, McChord AFB, Washington
 February 2003 – March 2004, deputy commander, 446th Mission Support Group, McChord AFB, Washington
 March 2004 – November 2005, chief, Logistics Resources Branch, Logistics Directorate, Headquarters 4th Air Force, March Air Reserve Base, California
 November 2005 – December 2007, individual mobilization augmentee to the director, global channel operations, Tanker Airlift Control Center, Scott AFB, IL. (May 2007 – September 2007, mission director, CENTCOM Deployment and Distribution Operations Center, Southwest Asia)
 January 2008 – March 2010, mobilization assistant to the director for logistics, engineering and security assistance, U.S. Pacific Command, Camp Smith, Hawaii
 March 2010 – April 2012, mobilization assistant to the director for logistics and sustainment, Headquarters Air Force Materiel Command, Wright-Patterson AFB, Ohio
 April 2012 – April 2015, mobilization assistant to the commander, Air Force Materiel Command, Wright-Patterson Air Force Base, Ohio (December 2014- April 2015, director of logistics, Headquarters Air Force Materiel Command, Wright- Patterson AFB, Ohio)
 April 2015 – June 2017, mobilization assistant to the deputy chief of staff for logistics, engineering and force protection, Headquarters U.S. Air Force, Washington, D.C.

Summary of joint assignments
 May 2007 – September 2007, mission director, CENTCOM Deployment and Distribution Operations Center, Southwest Asia, as a colonel
 January 2008 – March 2010, Mobilization Assistant to the Director for Logistics, Engineering and Security Assistance, U.S. Pacific Command, Camp Smith, Hawaii, as a colonel and brigadier general

Effective dates of promotion
 Second lieutenant – April 13, 1984
 First lieutenant – April 13, 1986
 Captain – April 13, 1988
 Major – March 8, 1996
 Lieutenant colonel – Sept. 29, 2000
 Colonel – May 1, 2004
 Brigadier general – Feb. 2, 2010
 Major general – April 21, 2013

See also
 List of female United States military generals and flag officers

References

Information provided directly from Maj Gen Patricia Rose.

External links
 

American LGBT military personnel
United States Air Force generals
Recipients of the Defense Superior Service Medal
Providence College alumni
Female generals of the United States Air Force
Women in the United States Air Force